USS S-11 (SS-116) was a second-group (S-3 or "Government") S-class submarine of the United States Navy.

Construction and commissioning
S-11′s keel was laid down on 2 December 1919 by the Portsmouth Navy Yard in Kittery, Maine. She was launched on 7 February 1921, sponsored by Anna Roosevelt, and commissioned on 11 January 1923 with Lieutenant Wilder D. Baker in command.

Service history

1923–1936
Supplementing duties along the coast of the Northeastern United States, S-11 visited Guantanamo Bay, Cuba, in 1923, and Saint Thomas in the United States Virgin Islands, Trinidad, and Coco Solo in the Panama Canal Zone in 1924. Departing New London, Connecticut, on 29 September 1924, transiting the Panama Canal and stopping in California along the way, she visited Hawaii from 27 April to 25 May 1925, before returning to New London on 12 July 1925.

S-11 operated in the Panama Canal area from January through April 1926, visited Kingston, Jamaica, from 20 March to 28 March 1927, and served again in the Panama Canal area from February into April 1928. From 1929 until 1936, S-11 operated almost exclusively in the Panama Canal area, but was in Miami, Florida, on 31 March 1930 and visited Washington, D.C., from 15 May to 5 June 1933. From at least 30 June 1929 until at least 7 August 1931, her commanding officer was V. R. Murphy.

Departing Coco Solo on 13 June 1936, S-11 arrived at Philadelphia, Pennsylvania, on 22 June 1936. She was decommissioned there on 30 September 1936.

1940–1945
S-11 was recommissioned on 6 September 1940 at Philadelphia. After voyages from New London to Philadelphia, Bermuda, and St. Thomas in 1941, S-11 arrived at the Coco Solo submarine base in the Panama Canal Zone, on 5 October 1941 and was based there when the Japanese attack on Pearl Harbor brought the United States into World War II on 7 December 1941. On 16 August 1942, U.S. Navy yard patrol boats mistakenly depth-charged her off Cape Mala on Panama′s Pacific coast after they mistook her for a Japanese submarine. She suffered minor damage.

S-11 continued to serve in the Panama Canal area until June 1943, and next at Trinidad until February 1944. Following overhaul in the Panama Canal area, she proceeded in July 1944 via Aruba to Trinidad, where she operated until October 1944. Arriving at Guantanamo Bay on 26 October 1944, she served there until January 1945. After a voyage to the Panama Canal area, she departed the Panama Canal Zone on 8 February 1945 and arrived at New London on 24 February 1945 and at Philadelphia on 28 March 1945.

Decommissioning and disposal
S-11 was decommissioned on 2 May 1945 at Philadelphia and was struck from the Naval Vessel Register. She was sold on 28 October 1945 to Rosoff Brothers of New York City for scrapping. She later was resold to Northern Metals Company of Philadelphia before she was scrapped.

References

Citations

Bibliography
 Hinman, Charles R., and Douglas E. Campbell. The Submarine Has No Friends: Friendly Fire Incidents Involving U.S. Submarines During World War II. Syneca Research Group, Inc., 2019. .

Ships built in Kittery, Maine
S-11
World War II submarines of the United States
1921 ships
Maritime incidents in August 1942
Friendly fire incidents of World War II